James Whitehill (January 31, 1762 – February 26, 1822) was a member of the U.S. House of Representatives from Pennsylvania.

James Whitehill (son of John Whitehill and nephew of Robert Whitehill) was born in Strasburg, Pennsylvania.  He studied law, was admitted to the bar and commenced practice in Strasburg.  He served as associate judge of the Lancaster County Court from January 3, 1811, to February 1, 1813, when he resigned, having been elected to Congress.  He served in the War of 1812 as major general of Pennsylvania Militia.

Whitehill was elected as a Republican to the Thirteenth Congress and served until his resignation on September 1, 1814.  He engaged in mercantile pursuits in Strasburg and served as burgess of Strasburg in 1816.  He was again associate judge of the county court from October 17, 1820, until his death in Strasburg in 1822.  Interment in the Presbyterian Church Cemetery in Leacock, Pennsylvania.

Sources

The Political Graveyard

1762 births
1822 deaths
People from Strasburg, Pennsylvania
American Presbyterians
American militiamen in the War of 1812
Pennsylvania state court judges
Pennsylvania lawyers
Democratic-Republican Party members of the United States House of Representatives from Pennsylvania
American militia generals
19th-century American lawyers
Military personnel from Pennsylvania